The 1981–82 season was Blackpool F.C.'s 74th season (71st consecutive) in the Football League. They competed in the 24-team Division Four, then the bottom tier of English football, finishing twelfth.

This was the first season in which three points were awarded for a win, instead of two.

Dave Bamber was the club's top scorer, with seventeen goals (fifteen in the league, one in the FA Cup and one in the League Cup).

Table

References

Blackpool F.C.
Blackpool F.C. seasons